Lagopsis is a genus of the mint family, first described in 1835. It is native to Siberia, China, Mongolia, and Central Asia.

Species
Lagopsis darwiniana Pjak - Mongolia
Lagopsis eriostachya (Benth.) Ikonn.-Gal. - Tuva, Irkutsk, Mongolia, Xinjiang, Qinghai
Lagopsis flava Kar. & Kir. - Xinjiang, Kazakhstan, Kyrgyzstan
Lagopsis marrubiastrum (Stephan) Ikonn.-Gal. - Altai Republic in Siberia, Ladakh Range of Tibet and Kashmir
Lagopsis supina (Steph. ex Willd.) Ikonn.-Gal. - China, Mongolia, Siberia

References

Lamiaceae
Lamiaceae genera